Commission des écoles catholiques de Verdun was a Roman Catholic school district headquartered in Verdun, Quebec.

It was dissolved after 1998. Currently Commission scolaire Marguerite-Bourgeoys operates secular Francophone schools in Verdun, while Lester B. Pearson School Board operates secular Anglophone schools in Verdun.

Schools
Secondary:
 École secondaire Notre-Dame-du-Sourire
 École secondaire Mgr-Richard
 École Polyvalente catholique anglaise de Verdun (English: Verdun English Catholic Comprehensive School)

Primary:
 Chanoine-Joseph-Théorêt
 École primaire Île des Soeurs 
 Lévis-Sauvé
 Notre-Dame-de-Lourdes
 Notre-Dame-de-la-Garde
 Notre-Dame-de-la-Paix
 Notre-Dame-des-Sept-Douleurs
 St-Thomas More - English-language school

References

External links
 

Historical school districts in Quebec
Verdun, Quebec
Education in Montreal